James Erskine Wemyss (9 July 1789 – 3 April 1854) was a Scottish MP and Rear-Admiral.

He was the son of William Wemyss by his wife Frances, daughter of Sir William Erskine, 1st Baronet. In 1820 he succeeded his father as Member of Parliament for Fife, sitting until 1831. He represented the county again from 1832 to 1847.

By his wife Lady Emma, daughter of William Hay, 17th Earl of Erroll, he was father of James Hay Erskine Wemyss, also later MP for Fife.

See also

References
 http://thepeerage.com/p1087.htm#i10869
 https://web.archive.org/web/20111003160503/http://www.leighrayment.com/commons/Fcommons.htm

External links 
 

1789 births
1854 deaths
Members of the Parliament of the United Kingdom for Scottish constituencies
Royal Navy rear admirals
UK MPs 1820–1826
UK MPs 1826–1830
UK MPs 1830–1831
UK MPs 1832–1835
UK MPs 1835–1837
UK MPs 1837–1841
UK MPs 1841–1847
Members of the Parliament of the United Kingdom for Fife constituencies
Royal Navy personnel of the Napoleonic Wars